Asyneuma compactum is a species of flowering plant in the Campanulaceae family which is endemic to Turkey.

Taxonomy

Infraspecifics
Asyneuma compactum var. eriocarpum

References

compactum

Endemic flora of Turkey